Puncturella granulata is a species of sea snail, a marine gastropod mollusk in the family Fissurellidae, the keyhole limpets.

Description
The size of the shell varies between 2.5 mm and 8 mm.

Distribution
This marine species occurs in the Caribbean Sea and from the Florida Keys, USA to the Antilles and Brazil

References

 Turgeon, D.D., et al. 1998. Common and scientific names of aquatic invertebrates of the United States and Canada. American Fisheries Society Special Publication 26 page(s): 57
 Rosenberg, G., F. Moretzsohn, and E. F. García. 2009. Gastropoda (Mollusca) of the Gulf of Mexico, Pp. 579–699 in Felder, D.L. and D.K. Camp (eds.), Gulf of Mexico–Origins, Waters, and Biota. Biodiversity. Texas A&M Press, College Station, Texas
 Intergovernmental Oceanographic Commission (IOC) of UNESCO. The Ocean Biogeographic Information System (OBIS)

External links
 Seguenza, G. (1863). Paleontologia malacologica delle rocce terziarie del distretto di Messina studiata nei suoi rapporto zoologici e geognostici. Annali dell'Accademia degli Aspiranti Naturalisti, Napoli. 3(2): 2–77
 all W.H. 1889. Reports on the results of dredging, under the supervision of Alexander Agassiz, in the Gulf of Mexico (1877–78) and in the Caribbean Sea (1879–80), by the U.S. Coast Survey Steamer "Blake", Lieut.-Commander C.D. Sigsbee, U.S.N., and Commander J.R. Bartlett, U.S.N., commanding. XXIX. Report on the Mollusca. Part 2, Gastropoda and Scaphopoda. Bulletin of the Museum of Comparative Zoölogy at Harvard College, 18: 1–492, pls. 10–40., available online at http://www.biodiversitylibrary.org/item/25505 page(s): 403–404
  Serge GOFAS, Ángel A. LUQUE, Joan Daniel OLIVER,José TEMPLADO & Alberto SERRA (2021) - The Mollusca of Galicia Bank (NE Atlantic Ocean); European Journal of Taxonomy 785: 1–114
 

Fissurellidae
Gastropods described in 1862